Delcy Eloína Rodríguez Gómez (born 18 May 1969) is a Venezuelan politician serving as the vice president of Venezuela since 2018. She was also Minister of Popular Power for Communication and Information of Venezuela from 2013 to 2014, Minister of Foreign Affairs from 2014 to 2017 and President of the Constituent Assembly of Venezuela from 4 August 2017 to 14 June 2018. The European Union, the United States and Canada have placed sanctions on her.

Political career 

She held several posts during the course of the Chavez administration: as International Affairs Director in the Ministry of Energy and Mines, in 2003; as Vice-minister for European Affairs in 2005; serving from February–August 2006 as the Minister for Presidential Affairs and the following year as General Coordinator to the Vice-President of Venezuela, both of which roles she held while her brother occupied the office of Vice President of the Republic. She was the Minister for Presidential Affairs in 2006. Similarly, she was Vice Minister for Europe at the Venezuelan Ministry of Foreign Relations. She also served as the General Coordinator to the Vice President of Venezuela. According to a profile published in the daily Tal Cual, Rodriguez pursued a concentration in labor law in Paris, France, taught at UCV and was a member of the Venezuelan Association of Labor Lawyers.

Since 2016, Rodriguez has been an outspoken defender of Venezuelan government domestic actions in the face of calls from Luis Almagro, Secretary General of the Organization of American States, to suspend Venezuelan membership in the organization for violating the OAS Democratic Charter. On 21 June 2017, Rodriguez left her post to run for the Constituent National Assembly. President Maduro accepted her resignation from the Ministry of Foreign Affairs. She was succeeded by Samuel Moncada.

Vice President 
On 14 June 2018, President Maduro named Rodríguez to be Vice President of Venezuela, succeeding Tareck El Aissami. She also became the head official of the Bolivarian Intelligence Service (SEBIN), Venezuela's intelligence agency, as it is dependent on the office of the vice presidency.

In November 2022, she visited the Sheikh Zayed Grand Mosque in Abu Dhabi.

Sanctions 
Rodríguez has been sanctioned by several countries and is banned from entering neighboring Colombia. The Colombian government maintains a list of people banned from entering Colombia or subject to expulsion; as of January 2019, the list had 200 people with a "close relationship and support for the Nicolás Maduro regime".

On 22 September 2017, Canada sanctioned Rodríguez due to rupture of Venezuela's constitutional order.

Shortly after being named Vice President of Venezuela, Rodríguez was one of eleven officials sanctioned by the European Union on 25 June 2018, with her assets frozen and a travel ban issued against her after she "undermined democracy and the rule of law in Venezuela."

The Mexican Senate froze the assets of officials of the Maduro administration, including Delcy Rodríguez, and prohibited them from entering Mexico on 20 April 2018.

Switzerland sanctioned Rodríguez on 10 July 2018, freezing her assets and imposing a travel ban while citing the same reasons of the European Union.

The United States sanctioned Rodríguez on 25 September 2018 for "corruption and humanitarian issues."

In January 2020, despite the entry ban imposed by the European Union since 2018, Rodríguez met Spain's minister José Luis Ábalos (PSOE) in Madrid–Barajas Airport.

Personal life 
Her brother, Jorge Jesús Rodríguez, served as Mayor of Caracas, as well as vice president.

Delcy was in a relationship with Smartmatic co-founder Alfredo José Anzola prior to his death in a plane crash in April 2008.

See also 
List of Ministers of Foreign Affairs of Venezuela
List of current foreign ministers
List of foreign ministers in 2017
List of female foreign ministers

References

External links 
 

|-

|-

|-

1969 births
Living people
United Socialist Party of Venezuela politicians
Female foreign ministers
Politicians from Caracas
Venezuelan Ministers of Foreign Affairs
21st-century Venezuelan women politicians
21st-century Venezuelan politicians
People of the Crisis in Venezuela
Vice presidents of Venezuela
Women vice presidents
Venezuelan women lawyers
Women government ministers of Venezuela
Finance ministers of Venezuela
Members of the Venezuelan Constituent Assembly of 2017